Eas Bàn (Gaelic for pale or white waterfall) is the name of a number of waterfalls in Scotland:
Eas Bàn, Arran
Eas Bàn, Bruichladdich
Eas Bàn, Dundonnell
Eas Bàn, Glen Elchaig (east)
Eas Bàn, Glen Elchaig (west)
Eas Bàn, Grey Corries
Eas Bàn, Kishorn